Yenikonak can refer to:

 Yenikonak, Elâzığ
 Yenikonak, Güney